Micah Altman (born August 31, 1967) is an American social scientist who conducts research in social science informatics. Since 2012, he has worked as the head research scientist in the MIT Libraries, first as director of the Program on Information Science (2012-2018) and subsequently as director of  research for the libraries' Center for Research on Equitable and Open Scholarship. Altman previously worked at Harvard University. He is known for his work on redistricting, scholarly communication, privacy and open science. Altman is a co-founder of Public Mapping Project, which develops DistrictBuilder, an open-source software.

Biography
Altman was born on August 31, 1967, in St. Louis, Missouri, United States. He studied computer science and political philosophy at Brown University, graduating in 1989. He then went to the California Institute of Technology where he studied social science under Morgan Kousser and received a Ph.D. in 1998. He worked as a postdoctoral researcher in Gary King's research group at Harvard University.

From 1998 to 2012 Altman held a number of research positions at Harvard University, including Senior Research Scientist at the Institute of Quantitative Social Science, Archival Director for the Murray Research Archive and associate director of the Harvard-MIT Data Center. In 1998, Altman was awarded the "Leon Weaver Award" from the American Political Science Association. In 2004, together with Jeff Gill and Michael P. McDonald, he co-authored Numerical Issues in Statistical Computing for the Social Scientist, a book in the field of computational statistics that had several re-editions.

In January 2011, Altman and McDonald presented their Public Mapping Project, which developed DistrictBuilder, an open-source software redistricting application designed to provide online mapping tools. This was awarded Best policy innovations from Politico (2011), the Antonio Pizzigati Prize for Software in the Public Interest from the Tides (2013) and the Brown Democracy Medal from Pennsylvania State University (2018).

In March 2012, Altman was appointed as Director of Research at Massachusetts Institute of Technology Libraries and Head Scientist for the Program for Information Science, and a non-resident senior fellow at the Brookings Institution in Washington, DC. Also in 2012, he received "The Best Research Software Award" from the American Political Science Association.

Research works

Electoral districting and redistricting
Altman's contributions to electoral districting and redistricting have been both theoretical and implementational. He established that the computational complexity of the districting problem is NP-hard and hence optimal redistricting is likely to be intractable.

The undesirable implications of this result are that redistricting cannot be fully automated in practice and the choice of constraints and manual selection of the winning, "optimal" plan from a group of auto-generated plans, reintroduce value-laden and politically biased decision making back into the redistricting process (something that the use of "objective" computer programs was hoped to avoid), while potentially also legitimizing such undercover gerrymandering for the less knowledgeable public.

Further, computational simulations that he performed showed also that even the constraints that have been traditionally considered politically non-preferential, such as the overall compactness of the district, are not necessarily non-preferential because compactness requirements have different effects on political groups if the groups are distributed in geographically different ways. This result was referenced by the Supreme Court justices  in the Vieth v. Jubelirer case.

Altman and his colleagues later created the DistrictBuilder software (a successor to the BARD package), the first open-source system to enable the public to participate in redistricting directly through the creation of legal redistricting plans. This effort was awarded the Brown Democracy medal and Pizzigati award (see awards and recognition), after being used by the public to  create thousands of legal districting plans—which increased previous levels of public participation in redistricting.

Scientific data curation, preservation and replication
Altman's research in data curation and replication began in a collaboration with the Harvard libraries and Harvard-MIT Data Center (which is now a part of the Institute of Quantitative Social Science). This work included development of an open source institutional repository for data, named the Virtual Data Center, co-led with Sidney Verba and Gary King. The successor to the Virtual data center, the Dataverse Network, remains in broad use for data preservation and scientific replication.

Altman co-authored Numerical Issues in Statistical Computing for the Social Scientist with Jefferson Gill, and Michael P. McDonald in 2004, which demonstrated that the reproducibility of statistical analyses used in social science are threatened by errors and limitations in the statistical computations and software used to estimate them. Based on this analysis, Altman, McDonald and Gill developed methods to detect issues in social science statistical models and provide more replicable and reliable estimates.

Altman's research was focused on preservation, scientific replication, and scholarly communication. It included the development of standards for data citation; the creation of semantic fingerprint methods to verify data for scientific reuse, and long-term archiving; the analysis of technical and institutional approach to long-term preservation; the creation of taxonomic standards for author attribution (working with Amy Brand and other); and the characterization of grand-challenge problems in scholarly communications.

Information privacy
Over the last decade, Altman has been a leader in the Harvard University Privacy Tools project,  which conducts research and develops tools to improve data privacy. Altman has published several research articles with this group characterizing the mathematical underpinnings on information privacy threats, and developing new technical and legal approaches to privacy protection.

Awards and recognitions

Books

Selected publications

References

External links
 
 Micah Altman at Google Scholar
 Micah Altman profile at WorldCat

Massachusetts Institute of Technology fellows
American political scientists
Brown University alumni
Harvard University alumni
Harvard University faculty
1967 births
Scientists from St. Louis
Information scientists
California Institute of Technology alumni
Massachusetts Institute of Technology faculty
Redistricting in the United States
Living people
Brookings Institution people